Prison 77 is a 2022 Spanish historical thriller drama film directed by Alberto Rodríguez from a screenplay co-written with Rafael Cobos which stars Miguel Herrán and Javier Gutiérrez.

Set in the late 1970s in Barcelona's Modelo Prison, the plot consists of a critical revision of the so-called Transition in Spain, focusing on the plight of inmates imprisoned on common charges claiming for an amnesty that, unlike the case of fellow political prisoners, never came to pass.

The film opened the 70th San Sebastián International Film Festival on 16 September 2022, to be released theatrically in Spain a week later.

It scooped 16 nominations to the 37th Goya Awards, winning in five technical categories.

Plot 
The fiction follows two of the prisoners, José Pino and Manuel, an aged inmate who has passed through several prisons and a young accounting assistant who has just entered the prison, respectively.

Cast

Production 

The screenplay was co-written by the director Alberto Rodríguez alongside his customary scribe Rafael Cobos. The film is a Movistar Plus+ and Atípica Films production.

Filming started in Barcelona on 2 August 2021, using the actual  as shooting location. The first phase of filming was completed in late August 2021. Production then moved for the second and final phase to the province of Seville, wrapping on 4 October 2021.

Release 
Prison 77 screened out of competition as the opening film of the 70th San Sebastián International Film Festival on 16 September 2022. Distributed by Buena Vista International, the film was theatrically released in Spain on 23 September 2022. It will later be released on Movistar Plus+. It also made it to the 'World Cinema' section of 27th Busan International Film Festival. The film was invited to the 28th Kolkata International Film Festival (screening on 18 December 2022) as well as to the 27th International Film Festival of Kerala. TelevisaUnivision obtained rights to the film in Mexico, the United States, and Latin America, with a streaming debut on Vix+ scheduled for 22 March 2023.

Reception 

Andrea G. Bermejo of Cinemanía rated the film 4 out of 5 stars, concluding that some of the best performances of the year are present in the film, with the entire cast being "in deep communion with the story they want to tell".

Raquel Hernández Luján of HobbyConsolas rated it with 80 out of 100 points ("very good"), deeming the film to be "respectful of the harsh reality it portrays and at the same time [it] manages to take the story out of the corset of prison dramas".

Àlex Montoya of Fotogramas rated the film 4 out of 5 stars praising the "rigor and critical thinking at the service of entertainment, or vice versa. And the cast. All of it".

Fionnuala Halligan of ScreenDaily considered that the film features a Hunger-like depiction of "horrible injustice", displaying "a striking camera-work and fantastic costuming [that] can only hold the eye for so long as beating follows beating".

Top ten lists 
The film appeared on a number of critics' top ten lists of the best Spanish films of 2022:

Accolades 

|-
| rowspan = "2" align = "center" | 2022 || rowspan = "2" | 28th Forqué Awards || colspan = "2" | Best Film ||  || rowspan = "2" | 
|-
| Best Film Actor || Miguel Herrán || 
|-
| rowspan = "47" align = "center" | 2023 || rowspan = "5" | 10th Feroz Awards || colspan = "2" | Best Drama Film ||  || rowspan = "5" | 
|-
| Best Actor in a Film || Miguel Herrán || 
|-
| Best Supporting Actor in a Film || Jesús Carroza || 
|-
| Best Soundtrack || Julio de la Rosa || 
|-
| Best Trailer || Aitor Tapia || 
|-
| rowspan = "14" | 2nd Carmen Awards || colspan = "2" | Best Film ||  || rowspan = "14" | 
|-
| Best Director || Alberto Rodríguez || 
|-
| Best Original Screenplay || Rafael Cobos, Alberto Rodríguez || 
|-
| Best Actor || Miguel Herrán || 
|-
| rowspan = "2" | Best Supporting Actor || Fernando Tejero || 
|-
| Jesús Carroza ||  
|-
| Best Editing || José M. G. Moyano || 
|-
| Best Art Direction || Pepe Domínguez del Olmo || 
|-
| Best Cinematography || Álex Catalán || 
|-
| Best Production Supervision || Manuela Ocón Aburto || 
|-
| Best Original Score || Julio de la Rosa || 
|-
| Best Costume Design || Fernando García || 
|-
| Best Makeup and Hairstyles || Yolanda Piña, Félix Terreno || 
|-
| Best Sound || Dani de Zayas, Miguel Huete, Valeria Arcieri || 
|-
| rowspan = "7" | 78th CEC Medals || colspan = "2" | Best Film ||  || rowspan = "7" align = "center" | 
|-
| rowspan = "2" | Best Actor || Javier Gutiérrez || 
|-
| Miguel Herrán || 
|-
| Best Original Screenplay || Alberto Rodríguez, Rafael Cobos || 
|-
| Best Cinematography || Álex Catalán || 
|-
| Best Editing || José M.G. Moyano || 
|-
| Best Music || Julio de la Rosa || 
|-
| rowspan = "16 | 37th Goya Awards || colspan = "2" | Best Film ||  || rowspan = "16" | 
|-
| Best Director || Alberto Rodríguez || 
|-
| Best Original Screenplay || Alberto Rodríguez, Rafael Cobos || 
|-
| rowspan = "2" | Best Actor || Miguel Herrán || 
|-
| Javier Gutiérrez || 
|-
| rowspan = "2" | Best Supporting Actor || Fernando Tejero || 
|-
| Jesús Carroza || 
|-
| Best Cinematography || Álex Catalán || 
|-
| Best Editing || José M. G. Moyano || 
|-
| Best Original Score || Julio de la Rosa || 
|-
| Best Sound || Daniel de Zayas, Miguel Huete, Pelayo Gutiérrez, Valeria Arcieri || 
|-
| Best Art Direction || Pepe Domínguez del Olmo || 
|-
| Best Costume Design || Fernando García || 
|-
| Best Makeup and Hairstyles || Yolanda Piña, Félix Terrero || 
|-
| Best Special Effects || Esther Ballesteros, Ana Rubio || 
|-
| Best Production Supervision || Manuela Ocón Aburto || 
|-
| rowspan = "3" | 31st Actors and Actresses Union Awards || rowspan = "2" | Best Film Actor in a Leading Role || Javier Gutiérrez ||  || rowspan = "3" | 
|-
| Miguel Herrán || 
|-
| Best Film Actor in a Secondary Role || Fernando Tejero || 
|-
| rowspan = "2" | 10th Platino Awards || Best Film Editing || José M. G. Moyano ||  || rowspan = "2" align = "center"  | 
|-
| Best Art Direction || Pepe Domínguez del Olmo || 
|}

See also 
 List of Spanish films of 2022

References 

Films shot in the province of Seville
Films shot in Barcelona
Films set in Barcelona
Films set in 1976
Films set in 1977
Films set in 1978
Spanish thriller drama films
Films about prison escapes
Buena Vista International films
2020s Spanish films
2020s Spanish-language films
2022 thriller drama films
2020s prison films
Spanish prison films
Films about the Spanish Transition
Films directed by Alberto Rodríguez Librero